Player may refer to:

Role or adjective

 Player (game), a participant in a game or sport
 Gamer, a player in video and tabletop games
 Athlete, a player in sports 
 Player character, a character in a video game or role playing game who is controlled or controllable by a player
 Player (political), a participant in politics who has or is perceived to have influence or power
 Global player, a corporate organization that owns production of some good or service in at least one country other than its home country
 Player, Shakespearan term for a stage actor
 Player (slang), a philanderer, often male

People
 Willa Beatrice Player (1909-2003), American Educator
 Gary Player (born 1935), South African golfer
 Scott Player (born 1969), former NFL punter
 T-Dre Player (born 1992), Canadian football player

Art, entertainment, and media

 The Player, 1988 novel by Michael Tolkin, the basis for the 1992 film
 The Player (1953 film)
 The Player (1992 film), an American film

Music
 Player (band), a 1970s rock band from Los Angeles, California
 Player (Player album), 1977
 Player (M. Pokora album), 2006
 Player (Capsule album), 2010
 The Player (First Choice album), 1974
 The Player (The Supermen Lovers album), 2001
 "Player" (song), a 2015 song by Tinashe

Television 
 Player (TV channel), former name of Bravo 2, television channel in the United Kingdom
 The Player Channel, television channel in the United Kingdom
 The Player (Algerian TV series), a 2004 Algerian drama series
 The Player (2004 TV series), a 2004 American reality series
 The Player (2015 TV series), a 2015 American drama series
 Player (TV series), a 2018 South Korean TV series
 The Player (Thai TV series), a 2020 Thai drama series

Computing 
 Media player (software), a piece of software tailored for playing back different forms of multimedia file formats
 Player Project, a robot interface specification and software system

Technology
 Blu-ray Disc player, a device that plays discs with high definition video
 CD player, a device that plays audio discs
 DVD player, a device that plays discs produced under both the DVD-Video and DVD-Audio technical standards
 Player piano, a self-playing piano, containing a pneumatic or electro-mechanical mechanism that operates the piano action via pre-programmed music
 Record player, a device that plays vinyl records
 Tape player, a device that plays magnetic tapes

See also
 
 
 Play (disambiguation)
 Players (disambiguation)
 Ployer (disambiguation)